The 2014–15 NCAA Division I women's basketball season began in November and ended with the Final Four in Tampa, Florida, April 5–7. Practices officially began on October 3.

This was the final season in which NCAA women's basketball games were played in 20-minute halves. Beginning with the 2015–16 season, the women's game switched to 10-minute quarters, the standard for FIBA and WNBA play.

Season headlines 
 May 14 – The NCAA announces its Academic Progress Rate (APR) sanctions for the 2014–15 school year. A total of 36 programs in 11 sports are declared ineligible for postseason play due to failure to meet the required APR benchmark. While no women's basketball teams will be forbidden from postseason play due to APR sanctions, three Division I women's basketball teams are facing level 1 or 2 sanctions:
 New Orleans (Level 2)
 Savannah State (Level 1)
 Towson (Level 1)
 Southern is declared ineligible for postseason play in all sports for failing to supply usable academic data to the NCAA.

Milestones and records 
 February 3 – Connecticut's Geno Auriemma earns his 900th career win in the Huskies' 96–36 blowout of Cincinnati. Auriemma, coaching in his 1,034th game, breaks the previous record that was held by Pat Summitt for the fewest games to reach 900 wins. He also becomes the first man ever to reach the 900-win mark in NCAA women's basketball; the previous six coaches to do so are all women.

Conference membership changes

The 2014–15 season saw the final wave of membership changes resulting from a major realignment of NCAA Division I conferences. The cycle began in 2010 with the Big Ten and the then-Pac-10 publicly announcing their intentions to expand. The fallout from these conferences' moves later affected a majority of D-I conferences.

Season outlook

Pre-season polls

The top 25 from the AP and USA Today Coaches Polls.

Regular season

Early season tournaments

*Although these tournaments include more teams, only the number listed play for the championship.

Conference winners and tournaments
Thirty-one athletic conferences each end their regular seasons with a single-elimination tournament. The teams in each conference that win their regular season title are given the number one seed in each tournament. The winners of these tournaments receive automatic invitations to the 2015 NCAA Women's Division I Basketball Tournament. The Ivy League does not have a conference tournament, instead giving their automatic invitation to their regular season champion.

Statistical leaders

Postseason tournaments

NCAA tournament

Final Four – Amalie Arena, Tampa, Florida

Tournament upsets
For this list, a "major upset" is defined as a win by a team seeded 7 or more spots below its defeated opponent.

Women's National Invitation tournament

After the NCAA Tournament field is announced, 64 teams were invited to participate in the Women's National Invitation Tournament. The tournament began on March 20, 2013, and ended with the final on April 6. Unlike the men's National Invitation Tournament, whose semifinals and finals are held at Madison Square Garden, the WNIT holds all of its games at campus sites.

WNIT Semifinals and Final
Played at campus sites

Women's Invitational tournament

The sixth Women's Basketball Invitational (WBI) Tournament began in March 2015 and will end with a best-of-three final scheduled for March 31, April 2, and April 5; the final went the full three games. This tournament featured 16 teams who were left out of the NCAA Tournament and NIT.

WBI Semifinals and Final
Played at campus sites

Conference standings

Award winners

All-America teams

The NCAA has never recognized a consensus All-America team in women's basketball. This differs from the practice in men's basketball, in which the NCAA uses a combination of selections by the  Associated Press (AP), the National Association of Basketball Coaches (NABC), the Sporting News, and the United States Basketball Writers Association (USBWA) to determine a consensus All-America team. The selection of a consensus team is possible because all four organizations select at least a first and second team, with only the USBWA not selecting a third team.

However, of the major selectors in women's basketball, only the AP divides its selections into separate teams. The women's counterpart to the NABC, the Women's Basketball Coaches Association (WBCA), selects a single 10-member (plus ties) team, as does the USBWA. The NCAA does not recognize Sporting News as an All-America selector in women's basketball.

With that in mind, the following players were named to at least two of the three major teams:

Major player of the year awards
Wooden Award: Breanna Stewart, Connecticut
Naismith Award: Breanna Stewart, Connecticut
Associated Press Player of the Year: Breanna Stewart, Connecticut
Wade Trophy: Breanna Stewart, Connecticut
espnW National Player of the Year Jewell Loyd, Notre Dame

Major freshman of the year awardsUSBWA National Freshman of the Year (USBWA): Kelsey Mitchell, Ohio State

Major coach of the year awardsAssociated Press Coach of the Year: Sue Semrau, Florida StateNaismith College Coach of the Year: Courtney Banghart, PrincetonWBCA National Coach of the Year: Sue Semrau, Florida State

Other major awardsNancy Lieberman Award (best point guard): Moriah Jefferson, ConnecticutSenior CLASS Award (top senior): Samantha Logic, IowaMaggie Dixon Award (top first-year head coach): Lisa Fortier, GonzagaAcademic All-American of the Year (Top scholar-athlete): Ashley Luke, Western IllinoisElite 89 Award (Top GPA among upperclass players at Final Four):'''

Coaching changes
A number of teams changed coaches during and after the season.

See also
2014–15 NCAA Division I men's basketball season

References

 
2014–15 in American women's college basketball